Simon Robert Lightwood (born 15 December 1980) is a British Labour Party politician serving as Member of Parliament (MP) for Wakefield since the 2022 by-election, following the resignation of Conservative MP, Imran Ahmad Khan. Lightwood is also notable for being the last Member of Parliament to swear his Oath of Allegiance to Queen Elizabeth II, as his by-election was the last before her passing three months later.

Early life and education
Lightwood was born in 1980 and grew up in poverty in South Shields. After his family home was repossessed when he was aged 13, he was forced to live with his grandmother, away from his parents. Lightwood has a degree in theatre acting from Bretton Hall College and bought his first house in Wakefield.

Early career 
Lightwood was a case worker for Mary Creagh,  MP for the constituency from 2005 to 2019. He later worked for the National Health Service, and has served on the Labour Party's National Policy Forum as a Yorkshire representative. At the time of running for parliament, he was head of communications for Calderdale and Huddersfield NHS Foundation Trust.

Parliamentary career 
On 3 May 2022, Imran Ahmad Khan resigned as MP for Wakefield after being convicted of sexually assaulting a teenage boy, thus forcing a by-election. On 12 May, Lightwood was announced as one of four Labour Party candidates for the longlist, alongside Community Union employee Kate Dearden; Sam Howarth, an employee of Barnsley Central MP Dan Jarvis and who had previously worked for Jenny Chapman; and Rachael Kenningham.

Wakefield Constituency Labour Party (CLP) selected Dearden and Lightwood for the shortlist, but the following day, the entire CLP executive committee (barring one externally appointed individual) resigned in protest at the absence of any candidates on the list who lived in Wakefield. In a statement, they said: "We asked for local candidates, but there are none. Three prominent council and local Labour candidates, including the deputy council leader didn't even make it onto the 'long list'. A short list of four was requested by our representative on the panel to give members some choice but the NEC members insisted on just two."

Lightwood was selected on 15 May.  The local Labour committee walked out of the room, but The Guardian reported that "several officers appeared to be uneasy about the walkout".

Lightwood was elected on 23 June 2022 with a 4,925 majority. He made his maiden speech on 11 July 2022, paying tribute to some of his predecessors (Mary Creagh, David Hinchliffe and Walter Harrison) but declined to talk positively about his direct predecessor (Khan), instead celebrating victims and survivors of sexual and domestic violence.

He later became a patron of LGBT+ Labour.

At the 2022 Labour Party Conference, Lightwood was appointed Shadow Minister for Buses and Taxis taking over from Sam Tarry.

Political views 
In his maiden speech, Lightwood supported a windfall tax in response to the cost of living crisis.

Personal life 
Lightwood lives in the Calder Valley constituency with his husband, however has pledged to move into Wakefield following his election.

References

External links

1980 births
20th-century English LGBT people
21st-century English LGBT people
Alumni of Bretton Hall College
LGBT members of the Parliament of the United Kingdom
English LGBT politicians
Labour Party (UK) MPs for English constituencies
Living people
People from South Shields
Politicians from Tyne and Wear
UK MPs 2019–present